Jared Carter may refer to:
Jared Carter (Latter Day Saints) (1801–1849), an early missionary in the Latter Day Saint movement
Jared Carter (poet) (born 1939), an American poet